Horné Strháre is a village and municipality in the Veľký Krtíš District of the Banská Bystrica Region of southern Slovakia.

History
In historical records the village was first mentioned in 1243 (Eztergur, Vzturgar), when it belonged to Hont Castle. After, it passed to Lords Kacsics and, in 1327, to Szécsényi. From 1554 to 1594 it was occupied by Turks. In the 17th century it belonged to Divín (Zichy) and Modrý Kameň (Balassa)

Genealogical resources

The records for genealogical research are available at the state archive "Statny Archiv in Banska Bystrica, Slovakia"
 Roman Catholic church records (births/marriages/deaths): 1754-1896 (parish B)
 Lutheran church records (births/marriages/deaths): 1786-1836 (parish B)

See also
 List of municipalities and towns in Slovakia

References

External links
 
 http://www.e-obce.sk/obec/hornestrhare/horne-strhare.html
 Surnames of living people in Horne Strhare

Villages and municipalities in Veľký Krtíš District